The 1910–11 Connecticut Aggies men's basketball team represented Connecticut Agricultural College, now the University of Connecticut, in the 1910–11 collegiate men's basketball season. The Aggies did not play any games during the 1908–09 or 1909–10 seasons. The Aggies completed the season with a 1–2 overall record. The Aggies were members of the Athletic League of New England State Colleges.

Schedule 

|-
!colspan=12 style=""| Regular Season

Schedule Source:

References 

UConn Huskies men's basketball seasons
Connecticut
1910 in sports in Connecticut
1911 in sports in Connecticut